Pishkamar District is a district (bakhsh) in Kalaleh County, Golestan Province, Iran. At the 2006 census, its population was 23,610, in 4,863 families.  The District has no cities. The District has one rural district (dehestan): Zavkuh Rural District.

References 

Districts of Golestan Province
Kalaleh County